Kieran Kelly may refer to:

 Kieran Kelly (jockey) (1978–2003), Irish jump jockey
 Kieran Kelly (hurler), hurler for Antrim, Northern Ireland
 Kieran Patrick Kelly, suspected serial killer from Laois